The Cooper Street Correctional Facility is a minimum-security state prison for men located in Jackson, Jackson County, Michigan, owned and operated by the Michigan Department of Corrections.

The facility was created from the former grounds of the Michigan Parole Camp, which was across the street from the former Michigan State Prison.  The prison opened in 1997 and holds 814 inmates at a minimum security level, as the common point for processing of all male state prisoners about to be discharged, paroled, or transferred.

References

Prisons in Michigan
Buildings and structures in Jackson County, Michigan
1997 establishments in Michigan